Birpara is a village in Kamrup rural district, in the state of Assam, India, situated in south bank of river Brahmaputra.

Transport
The village is located north of National Highway 31 and connected to nearby towns and cities like Bamunigaon, Chaygaon, Boko and Guwahati with regular buses and other modes of transportation. Bamunigaon railway station is located here.

See also
 Bihdia
 Bhomolahati

References

Villages in Kamrup district